City of Lost Souls  is a 1983 German musical film directed by Rosa von Praunheim and performed by drag queens, travesty artists and transgender people. The film received international attention and became a cult movie beyond the LGBT community.

Plot
City of Lost Souls is a primarily fictional narrative about the lives of US cabaret performers and other immigrants in Berlin. The performers struggle for social recognition and professional prospects, bringing autobiographical and authentic aspects of their biographies and life experiences into the plot.

Awards
 1983: Nomination for the Gold Hugo at the Chicago International Film Festival

Reception
In the context of the time, the transgender film was praised as revolutionary: "This riotous and massively ahead-of-its-time intersectional queer-punk musical has gone on to greatly influence transgender politics." (Australian Centre for the Moving Image) Phil Ieropoulos, Professor of Directing at Buckinghamshire New University, wrote in a treatise on art films: "Featuring trans and genderqueer characters and drag superstars of the era, but also a bizarre structure that alternates between interviews, voice-overs, songs and performance art, City of Lost Souls is one of the coolest films you'll ever see." "[...] Praunheim succeeds in creating a space in which transgender women and sexual pluralism are celebrated without violence or rebuke." (Another Gaze Film Journal) "This 1983 trans punk musical is the instant cult classic [...]". (Mary and Leigh Block Museum of Art)

Notes

References 
Murray, Raymond. Images in the Dark: An Encyclopedia of Gay and Lesbian Film and Video. TLA Publications, 1994,

External links

1983 films
German LGBT-related films
1983 LGBT-related films
West German films
Films directed by Rosa von Praunheim
Films set in Berlin
1980s German films